Hurricane Eyes is the seventh studio album by Japanese heavy metal band Loudness. It was released in 1987 worldwide with standard English lyrics. A "Japanese Version" was subsequently released only in Japan later in the year with Niihara singing most of the lyrics in Japanese.
The album was produced by the famous producer and sound engineer Eddie Kramer, who had worked with the likes of The Rolling Stones, Led Zeppelin, Jimi Hendrix and Kiss. The song "So Lonely", a reprise of "Ares Lament" from the album Disillusion of 1984, was instead produced by Andy Johns, another world-famous producer. This was the last Loudness album to enter the US Billboard 200 chart, where it remained for 4 weeks, peaking at No. 190.

Track listings

Worldwide version
All music by Akira Takasaki, all lyrics by Minoru Niihara
"S.D.I." – 4:15
"This Lonely Heart" – 4:08
"Rock 'n' Roll Gypsy" – 4:22
"In My Dreams" – 4:30
"Take Me Home" – 3:16
"Strike of the Sword" – 3:50
"Rock This Way" – 4:07
"In This World Beyond" – 4:26
"Hungry Hunter" – 4:08
"So Lonely" – 4:43

Japanese version
"Strike of the Sword" – 3:52
"So Lonely" – 4:46
"This Lonely Heart" – 4:05
"Hungry Hunter" – 4:08
"In This World Beyond" – 4:27
"Take Me Home" – 3:18
"Rock 'n' Roll Gypsy" – 4:40
"In My Dreams" – 4:40
"Rock This Way" – 4:07
"S.D.I." – 4:21

Personnel
Loudness
 Minoru Niihara – vocals
 Akira Takasaki – guitars
 Masayoshi Yamashita – bass
 Munetaka Higuchi – drums

Additional musicians
 Gregg Giuffria – keyboards
 Steve "Zeus" Johnstad, David Glen Eisley, Tod Howarth – background vocals and assistance with English lyrics

Production
 Eddie Kramer – producer, engineer, mixing
 Tory Swenson – engineer
 Thom Cadley, Hidemi Nakatani, Masashi Goto, Stan Katayama – assistant engineers
 Scott Mabuchi – mixing
 Andy Johns – producer and mixing on "So Lonely"
 Bill Freesh – engineer on "So Lonely"
 Ted Jensen – mastering at Sterling Sound, New York
 Sam Nagashima – coordinator
 Toshi Nakashita – executive producer

References

1987 albums
Loudness (band) albums
Albums produced by Eddie Kramer
Albums produced by Andy Johns
Atco Records albums
Warner Music Japan albums
Albums recorded at Sound City Studios